The Goleta Slough is an area of estuary, tidal creeks, tidal marsh, and wetlands near Goleta, California, United States. The slough empties into the Pacific Ocean through an intermittently closed mouth at Goleta Beach County Park just east of the UCSB campus and Isla Vista. The slough drains the Goleta Valley and watershed, and receives the water of all of the major creeks in the Goleta area including the southern face of the Santa Ynez Mountains.

The Santa Barbara Airport has the largest border on the slough and contains the largest part of the slough. UCSB, Isla Vista, the City of Goleta and other unincorporated areas of the county, including the landward bluffs of More Mesa, surround and encompass the rest of the slough.

The Goleta Slough as it exists today is the result of two major historical events of the late 19th century and first half of the 20th century. The first was the heavy grazing by cattle on the surrounding foothills and mountainsides followed by wide-ranging grassfires, heavy rains in 1861/62, and flooding which caused so much erosion and deposition of sediment in the mouths of the creeks emptying into Goleta Bay that most of the bay became silt-filled salt marsh in just a couple of years. The second event was the conversion of the marsh and remaining bay into a military airbase during World War II. The fill material was obtained by reducing the rest of Mescalitan Island which provided the material to fill the airport and the surrounding area. The former location of Mescalitan Island now contains a sewage treatment plant.

While no longer having a regularly navigable mouth, nor depths in most places suitable for anything except canoes, kayaks, and very small boats, the slough remains a very important area of vital wetlands, salt marsh, and estuarian creeks.

"The Goleta Slough wetlands ... are fragmented along the coast from More Mesa to UCSB Storke Campus". The Goleta Slough Ecological Reserve is administered by the Calif. Dept. of Fish and Game.

"The primary function of the Ecological Reserve is to provide habitat for wildlife and a setting for educational and research activities. Public utility and transportation corridors traverse the wetlands while airport runways, a sewage treatment plant, a power generation station, and light industrial facilities are constructed on filled portions of the marsh."

Historic use 

"It is estimated that Native American peoples began inhabiting the area some 9,000 years ago. Early European explorers used the embayment as an anchorage for large ships until the 1860s. The severe winter storms of 1861/62 filled the embayment with sediment. Agricultural development in the slough began in the 1870s and the following decades saw the construction of berms, levees and roads to further facilitate agricultural development. In 1928 a landing strip was established in the northeastern portion of the slough, which was expanded in 1942-43 for construction of the Marine Corps Air Station, now the Municipal Airport."

The Marine station, known as Marine Corps Air Station Santa Barbara, became inactive in 1946.

Adjacent use 
Goleta Slough is almost entirely surrounded by urban development, some of which extends into the wetlands. This includes the municipal airport to the north, the sewage treatment plant and the Southern California Gas Company's La Goleta Gas Field to the east, a public beach between the ocean and the slough, the campus of UC Santa Barbara to the south and west, and residential and light industrial operations to the north and west.

Adjacent historic use 
Cattle ranching began in 1846 followed by agricultural development on the uplands around the slough. A whaling station was established in about 1870, asphaltum mining commenced in the 1890s, development of small farms expanded to cover the entire mesa in the 1920s, and rapid urbanization began in the 1940s.

Tidal influence 

Extensive areas of the historic marsh below the high tide line are isolated from tidal influence by berms and dikes. Tidal flooding is limited to the south-central portion of the slough, extending into several of the major tributaries. Tidal amplitude in the upper reaches of the slough is diminished. During the summer months the tidal amplitude may become attenuated and eventually eliminated by progressive berming of the mouth. The beach berm is mechanically breached to maintain water quality in the slough.

Tributaries and flow 

The major tributaries of the Slough are Tecolotito Creek, Carneros Creek, and Atascadero Creek. Tecolotito Creek's highest flows are during winter storms; during the summer flows are intermittent. Carneros Creek's major flows are of the flash flood type, with intermittent flows in the summer months. Atascadero Creek is a stream that generally has perennial freshwater flow that is augmented by seepage and landscape watering. Highest flows are during winter storms. Other flow sources are runoff from the north-facing bluffs of UC Santa Barbara campus and More Mesa.

Habitat 

Habitat area has been surveyed for the City of Santa Barbara property, the largest portion of the wetlands. It is:
 of coastal salt marsh
 of mudflats
 of saltflats
 of creek and channels
8+ acres (32,000 m2) of riverine (riparian)
 of Palustrine (vernal wetlands)
 of scrub/shrub and forested wetlands.

Vegetation 
Vegetation includes pickleweed, alkali-heath, salt grass, Jaumea, salt bush, ditch-grass, pondweed, tule, and cattails. The shrubs include willows and coyote brush. The trees are primarily southern coastal oak.

Animals 

Animals using the wetlands include birds, fish, benthic invertebrates, insects, and other wildlife.

279 species of birds have been observed at Goleta Slough; of these 121 were water-associated, including 20 species of special status.

10 species of fish were identified in a 1993 sampling, dominated by Killifish, Topsmelt, Arrow goby (Clevelandia ios), and Western mosquitofish (Gambusia affinis)*. A gravid Steelhead trout (Oncorhynchus mykiss) was collected in Tecolotito creek in 1995.

Benthic invertebrates species composition is characterized by low diversity and densities. Three species of polychaetes and bivalves are identified. The epifaunal invertebrates that are abundant included the lined shore crab, yellow shore crab, and California horn snail.

November 1993 insect surveys conducted with a fine mesh seine or aquarium dip nets at the mouth and the back portion of the slough yielded 11 species; major taxonomic groups were bugs, damselflies, mayflies, beetles, caddisflies, butterflies and flies.

1986/87 trapping and visual surveys at the Storke Campus Wetlands identified two species of mice, one vole, one amphibian, and two species of reptiles. 1996 report identified the Western pond turtle (Actinemys marmorata) in Atascadero Creek from surveys in 1982 and 1994. The 1996 report also identified three special status species from a 1983 survey of the Ecological Reserve: Pallid bat (Antrozous pallidus), American badger (Taxidea taxus), and San Diego black-tailed jackrabbit (L. californicus bennettii). Ten species of mammals were identified in 1970 survey of the main portion of the slough.

Special Status Species

A 1996 report identified 20 special status species from various surveys (dates not specified): California brown pelican, southern bald eagle, peregrine falcon, snowy plover, common loon, American white pelican, double-crested cormorant, white-faced ibis, fulvous whistling duck, harlequin duck, northern harrier, golden eagle, osprey, long-billed curlew, California gull, elegant tern, and black skimmer. Those with specified dates included Belding's Savannah sparrow (1994), and California horned lark (1995).

The 1996 report identified the following mammals from a 1983 survey; pallid bat, American badger, and the San Diego black-tailed jackrabbit.

See also
 Goleta Beach
 Chumash Indians

References

This article incorporates text from a US Government website, which is in the public domain.

External links 

 Goleta Slough Management Committee
 Goleta Beach
 City of Goleta
 Beach Erosion Authority for Clean Oceans and Nourishment
 Shoreline Preservation Fund
 California Coastal Records Project (aerial photography) - by Kenneth and Gabrielle Adelman, CaliforniaCoastline.org, October 23, 2004
 UCSB Beach: 30 Years of Waxing and Waning - by Arthur Gibbs Sylvester, UCSB Geological Sciences Department, updated January 11, 2006
 Davidson Library - Beach Erosion Resources - by Janet Martorana, UCSB Library Services, updated January 30, 2006
 Determination of the source(s) of high nutrient concentration in Goleta Slough
 California Wetlands Information System
 Santa Barbara airport
 Accounts and Maps of the Goleta Slough

Landforms of Santa Barbara County, California
Goleta, California
Rivers of Santa Barbara County, California
Wetlands of California
Estuaries of California
Marshes of California
Rivers of Southern California